Kazakhstan–Uzbekistan relations refers to the relations between the neighbouring Republic of Kazakhstan and Republic of Uzbekistan. Kazakhstan has an Embassy in Tashkent and a Consulate General in Samarkand. Uzbekistan has an Embassy in Astana and have Consulates General in Almaty and Aktau.

Bilateral relations were elevated from a strategic partnership to an alliance in 2021.

History 
Both Kazakhstan and Uzbekistan were part of the Soviet Union before its official dissolution in 1991. In 2017, President Shavkat Mirziyoyev began to improve relations with Kazakhstan. 2018 was declared the "Year of Uzbekistan in Kazakhstan". On 27 November 2018, the President Nursultan Nazarbayev said: "Today our relationship is at a good level. We meet with Shavkat Mirziyoyev several times a year and discuss all pressing issues in the field of economic and political cooperation".

Visits
Former Uzbek President of Uzbekistan Islam Karimov has visited Kazakhstan several times. The same can also be said for former Kazakh president Nursultan Nazarbayev visiting Tashkent. On 15 April 2019, the Kazakh President Kassym-Jomart Tokayev and Mirziyoyev opened the Year of Kazakhstan in Uzbekistan during the former's visit to Tashkent. Tokayev noted that "We are connected by a single language, religion, common history and one destiny. Our peoples are the heirs of the ancient and great civilization of Central Asia".

Border 
At the start of the 21st century, 96% of the international border between Uzbekistan and Kazakhstan had been determined. In 2001, after mutual agreements, the border line in only three disputed areas (Bagys, Arnasai and Nsan) remained undrawn. By September 2002, Kazakhstan and Uzbekistan had fully resolved the course of their 2,440 km-long shared border.

Kazakhstan–Uzbekistan barrier 

On 19 October 2006, Kazakhstan built 45 km-long barrier along part of its border with Uzbekistan. The Kazakhstan–Uzbekistan barrier spans the Saryagash and Maktaaral administrative districts of southern Kazakhstan, and consists of a 2,5m-high barbed wire fence that includes searchlights. The barrier is situated along the heavily populated towns and cities of eastern Uzbekistan. It was built to curb drug smuggling across the border.

Ambassadors

Ambassadors of Kazakhstan to Uzbekistan 
 Saylau Batyrsha-uly (1993-1994)
 Nazhameden Iskaliev (1994-1997)
 Umirzak Uzbekov (1997-2003)
 Tleukhan Kabdrakhmanov (2003-2006)
 Askar Myrzakhmetov (2006-2007)
 Zautbek Turisbekov (2007-2009)
 Boribay Zheksembin (2010-2015)
 Yerik Utembayev (2016-2019)
 Darkhan Satybaldy (since 2019)

Ambassadors of Uzbekistan in Kazakhstan 
 Ikrom Nazarov (2016-2018)
 Saidikram Niyazkhodzhaev (since 2018)

See also 
 Foreign relations of Kazakhstan
 Foreign relations of Uzbekistan

References 

 
Uzbekistan
Bilateral relations of Uzbekistan